

Events

Pre-1600
 250 – Pope Fabian is martyred during the Decian persecution.
 649 – King Chindasuinth, at the urging of bishop Braulio of Zaragoza, crowns his son Recceswinth as co-ruler of the Visigothic Kingdom.
1156 – Finnish peasant Lalli kills English clergyman Henry, the Bishop of Turku, on the ice of Lake Köyliö.
1265 – The first English parliament to include not only Lords but also representatives of the major towns holds its first meeting in the Palace of Westminster, now commonly known as the "Houses of Parliament".
1320 – Duke Wladyslaw Lokietek becomes king of Poland.
1356 – Edward Balliol surrenders his claim to the Scottish throne to Edward III in exchange for an English pension.
1523 – Christian II is forced to abdicate as King of Denmark and Norway.
1567 – Battle of Rio de Janeiro: Portuguese forces under the command of Estácio de Sá definitively drive the French out of Rio de Janeiro.
1576 – The Mexican city of León is founded by order of the viceroy Don Martín Enríquez de Almanza.

1601–1900
1649 – The High Court of Justice for the trial of Charles I begins its proceedings.
1783 – The Kingdom of Great Britain signs preliminary articles of peace with the Kingdom of France, setting the stage for the official end of hostilities in the American Revolutionary War later that year.
1785 – Invading Siamese forces attempt to exploit the political chaos in Vietnam, but are ambushed and annihilated at the Mekong river by the Tây Sơn in the Battle of Rạch Gầm-Xoài Mút.
1788 – The third and main part of First Fleet arrives at Botany Bay, beginning the British colonization of Australia. Arthur Phillip decides that Port Jackson is a more suitable location for a colony.
1839 – In the Battle of Yungay, Chile defeats an alliance between Peru and Bolivia.
1841 – Hong Kong Island is occupied by the British during the First Opium War.
1874 – The Treaty of Pangkor is signed between the British and Sultan Abdullah of Perak, paving the way for further British colonization of Malaya.
1877 – The last day of the Constantinople Conference results in agreement for political reforms in the Balkans.
1887 – The United States Senate allows the Navy to lease Pearl Harbor as a naval base.

1901–present
1909 – Newly formed automaker General Motors (GM) buys into the Oakland Motor Car Company, which later becomes GM's long-running Pontiac division.
1921 – The British K-class submarine HMS K5 sinks in the English Channel; all 56 on board die.
  1921   – The first Constitution of Turkey is adopted, making fundamental changes in the source and exercise of sovereignty by consecrating the principle of national sovereignty.
1929 – The first full-length talking motion picture filmed outdoors, In Old Arizona, is released.
1936 – King George V of the United Kingdom dies. His eldest son succeeds to the throne, becoming Edward VIII. The title Prince of Wales is not used for another 22 years.
1937 – Franklin D. Roosevelt and John Nance Garner are sworn in for their second terms as U.S. President and U.S. Vice President; it is the first time a Presidential Inauguration takes place on January 20 since the 20th Amendment changed the dates of presidential terms.
1941 – A German officer is killed in Bucharest, Romania, sparking a rebellion and pogrom by the Iron Guard, killing 125 Jews and 30 soldiers.
1942 – World War II: At the Wannsee Conference held in the Berlin suburb of Wannsee, senior Nazi German officials discuss the implementation of the "Final Solution to the Jewish question".
1945 – World War II: The provisional government of Béla Miklós in Hungary agrees to an armistice with the Allies.
  1945   – World War II: Germany begins the evacuation of 1.8 million people from East Prussia, a task which will take nearly two months.
1949 – Point Four Program, a program for economic aid to poor countries, is announced by United States President Harry S. Truman in his inaugural address for a full term as president.
1954 – In the United States, the National Negro Network is established with 40 charter member radio stations.
1961 – John F. Kennedy is inaugurated the 35th President of the United States of America, becoming the youngest man to be elected into that office, and the first Catholic.
1972 – Pakistan launches its nuclear weapons program, a few weeks after its defeat in the Bangladesh Liberation War, as well as the Indo-Pakistani War of 1971.
1973 – Amílcar Cabral, leader of the independence movement in Guinea-Bissau and Cape Verde, is assassinated in Conakry, Guinea.
1974 – China gains control over all the Paracel Islands after a military engagement between the naval forces of China and South Vietnam.
1981 – Twenty minutes after Ronald Reagan is inaugurated as the 40th President of the United States of America, Iran releases 52 American hostages.
1986 – In the United States, Martin Luther King Jr. Day is celebrated as a federal holiday for the first time.
  1986   – Leabua Jonathan, Prime Minister of Lesotho, is ousted from power in a coup d'état led by General Justin Lekhanya.
1990 – Protests in Azerbaijan, part of the Dissolution of the Soviet Union.
1991 – Sudan's government imposes Islamic law nationwide, worsening the civil war between the country's Muslim north and Christian south.
1992 – Air Inter Flight 148, an Airbus A320-111, crashes into a mountain near Strasbourg, France, killing 87 of the 96 people on board.
2001 – President of the Philippines Joseph Estrada is ousted in a nonviolent four-day revolution, and is succeeded by Gloria Macapagal Arroyo.
2009 – Barack Obama is inaugurated as the 44th President of the United States of America, becoming the first African-American President of the United States. 
  2009   – A protest movement in Iceland culminates as the 2009 Icelandic financial crisis protests start.
2018 – A group of four or five gunmen attack The Inter-Continental Hotel in Kabul, Afghanistan, sparking a 12-hour battle. The attack kills 40 people and injures many others.
  2018   – Syrian civil war: The Government of Turkey announces the initiation of the Afrin offensive and begins shelling Syrian Democratic Forces (SDF) positions in Afrin Region.
2021 – Joe Biden is inaugurated as the 46th President of the United States of America.  At 78, he becomes the oldest person ever inaugurated.  Kamala Harris becomes the first female Vice President of the United States.

Births

Pre-1600
 225 – Gordian III, Roman emperor (d. 244)
1029 – Alp Arslan, Seljuk sultan (probable; d. 1072)
1292 – Elizabeth of Bohemia, queen consort of Bohemia (d. 1330)
1436 – Ashikaga Yoshimasa, Japanese shōgun (d. 1490)
1488 – Sebastian Münster, German scholar, cartographer, and cosmographer (d. 1552)
1499 – Sebastian Franck, German humanist (probable; d. 1543)
1500 – Jean Quintin, French priest, knight and writer (d. 1561)
1502 – Sebastian de Aparicio, Spanish-Mexican rancher and missionary (d. 1600)
1526 – Rafael Bombelli, Italian mathematician (d. 1572)
1554 – Sebastian of Portugal (d. 1578)
1569 – Heribert Rosweyde, Jesuit hagiographer (d. 1629)
1573 – Simon Marius, German astronomer and academic (d. 1624)
1586 – Johann Hermann Schein, German composer (d. 1630)

1601–1900
1664 – Giovanni Vincenzo Gravina, Italian lawyer and jurist (d. 1718)
1703 – Joseph-Hector Fiocco, Flemish violinist and composer (d. 1741)
1716 – Jean-Jacques Barthélemy, French archaeologist and numismatist (d. 1795)
  1716   – Charles III of Spain (d. 1788)
1732 – Richard Henry Lee, American lawyer and politician, President of the Continental Congress (d. 1794)
1741 – Carl Linnaeus the Younger, Swedish botanist and author (d. 1783)
1755 – Sir Albemarle Bertie, 1st Baronet, English admiral (d. 1824)
1762 – Jérôme-Joseph de Momigny, Belgian-French composer and theorist (d. 1842)
1775 – André-Marie Ampère, French physicist and mathematician (d. 1836)
1781 – Joseph Hormayr, Baron zu Hortenburg, Austrian-German historian and politician (d. 1848)
1783 – Friedrich Dotzauer, German cellist and composer (d. 1860)
1799 – Anson Jones, American physician and politician, 5th President of the Republic of Texas (d. 1858)
1812 – Thomas Meik, Scottish engineer (d. 1896)
1814 – David Wilmot, American politician, sponsor of Wilmot Proviso (d. 1868)
1819 – Göran Fredrik Göransson, Swedish merchant, ironmaster and industrialist (d. 1900)
1834 – George D. Robinson, American lawyer and politician, 34th Governor of Massachusetts (d. 1896)
1855 – Ernest Chausson, French composer (d. 1899)
1856 – Harriot Stanton Blatch, U.S. suffragist and organizer (d. 1940) 
1865 – Yvette Guilbert, French singer and actress (d. 1944)
  1865   – Wilhelm Ramsay, Finnish geologist and professor (d. 1928)
1870 – Guillaume Lekeu, Belgian pianist and composer (d. 1894)
1873 – Johannes V. Jensen, Danish author, poet, and playwright, Nobel Prize laureate (d. 1950)
1874 – Steve Bloomer, English footballer and coach (d. 1938)
1876 – Josef Hofmann, Polish-American pianist and composer (d. 1957)
1878 – Finlay Currie, Scottish-English actor (d. 1968)
1879 – Ruth St. Denis, American dancer and educator (d. 1968)
1880 – Walter W. Bacon, American accountant and politician, 60th Governor of Delaware (d. 1962)
1882 – Johnny Torrio, Italian-American mob boss (d. 1957)
1883 – Enoch L. Johnson, American mob boss (d. 1968)
  1883   – Forrest Wilson, American journalist and author (d. 1942)
1888 – Lead Belly, American folk/blues musician and songwriter (d. 1949) 
1889 – Allan Haines Loughead, American engineer and businessman, founded the Alco Hydro-Aeroplane Company (d. 1969)
1891 – Mischa Elman, Ukrainian-American violinist (d. 1967)
1893 – Georg Åberg, Swedish triple jumper (d. 1946)
1894 – Harold Gray, American cartoonist, created Little Orphan Annie (d. 1968)
  1894   – Walter Piston, American composer, theorist, and academic (d. 1976)
1895 – Gábor Szegő, Hungarian mathematician and academic (d. 1985)
1896 – George Burns, American actor, comedian, and producer (d. 1996)
1898 – U Razak, Burmese educator and politician (d. 1947)
1899 – Clarice Cliff, English potter (d. 1972)
  1899   – Kenjiro Takayanagi, Japanese engineer (d. 1990)
1900 – Dorothy Annan, English painter, potter, and muralist (d. 1983)
  1900   – Colin Clive, English actor (d. 1937)

1901–present
1902 – Leon Ames, American actor (d. 1993)
  1902   – Kevin Barry, Irish Republican Army volunteer (d. 1920)
1906 – Aristotle Onassis, Greek shipping magnate (d. 1975)
1907 – Paula Wessely, Austrian actress and producer (d. 2000)
1909 – Gōgen Yamaguchi, Japanese martial artist (d. 1989)
1910 – Joy Adamson, Austria-Kenyan painter and conservationist (d. 1980)
1915 – Ghulam Ishaq Khan, Pakistani businessman and politician, 7th President of Pakistan (d. 2006)
1918 – Juan García Esquivel, Mexican pianist, composer, and bandleader (d. 2002)
  1918   – Nevin Scrimshaw, American scientist (d. 2013)
1920 – Federico Fellini, Italian director and screenwriter (d. 1993)
  1920   – DeForest Kelley, American actor (d. 1999)
  1920   – Thorleif Schjelderup, Norwegian ski jumper and author (d. 2006)
1921 – Telmo Zarra, Spanish footballer (d. 2006)
1922 – Don Mankiewicz, American author and screenwriter (d. 2015)
1923 – Slim Whitman, American country and western singer-songwriter and musician (d. 2013)
1924 – Yvonne Loriod, French pianist and composer (d. 2010)
1925 – Jamiluddin Aali, Pakistani poet, playwright, and critic (d. 2015)
  1925   – Ernesto Cardenal, Nicaraguan priest, poet, and politician (d. 2020)
1926 – Patricia Neal, American actress (d. 2010)
  1926   – David Tudor, American pianist and composer (d. 1996)
1927 – Qurratulain Hyder, Indian-Pakistani journalist and academic (d. 2007)
1928 – Antonio de Almeida, French conductor and musicologist (d. 1997)
1929 – Arte Johnson, American actor and comedian (d. 2019)
  1929   – Masaharu Kawakatsu, Japanese biologist
  1929   – Fireball Roberts, American race car driver (d. 1964)
1930 – Buzz Aldrin, American colonel, pilot, and astronaut
1931 – David Lee, American physicist and academic, Nobel Prize laureate
  1931   – Hachidai Nakamura, Japanese pianist and composer (d. 1992)
1932 – Lou Fontinato, Canadian ice hockey player (d. 2016)
1934 – Hennie Aucamp, South African poet, author, and academic (d. 2014)
  1934   – Tom Baker, English actor
1935 – Dorothy Provine, American actress, singer, and dancer (d. 2010)
1937 – Bailey Howell, American basketball player
1938 – Derek Dougan, Irish-English footballer and journalist (d. 2007)
1939 – Paul Coverdell, American captain and politician (d. 2000)
  1939   – Chandra Wickramasinghe, Sri Lankan-English mathematician, astronomer, and biologist
1940 – Carol Heiss, American figure skater and actress
  1940   – Krishnam Raju, Indian actor and politician
  1940   – Mandé Sidibé, Malian economist and politician, Prime Minister of Mali (d. 2009)
1942 – Linda Moulton Howe, American journalist and producer
1944 – José Luis Garci, Spanish director and producer
  1944   – Farhad Mehrad, Iranian singer-songwriter and guitarist (d. 2002)
  1944   – Pat Parker, American poet (d. 1989)
1945 – Christopher Martin-Jenkins, English journalist and sportscaster (d. 2013)
  1945   – Eric Stewart, English singer-songwriter, guitarist, and producer
1946 – David Lynch, American director, producer, and screenwriter
  1946   – Vladimír Merta, Czech singer-songwriter, guitarist, and journalist
1947 – Cyrille Guimard, French cyclist and sportscaster
1948 – Nancy Kress, American author and academic
  1948   – Natan Sharansky, Ukrainian-Israeli physicist and politician, Deputy Prime Minister of Israel
1949 – Göran Persson, Swedish lawyer and politician, 31st Prime Minister of Sweden
1950 – Daniel Benzali, Brazilian-American actor
  1950   – William Mgimwa, Tanzanian banker and politician, 13th Tanzanian Minister of Finance (d. 2014)
  1950   – Mahamane Ousmane, Nigerien politician, President of Niger
1951 – Ian Hill, English rock bassist
  1951   – Iván Fischer, Hungarian conductor and composer
1952 – Nikos Sideris, Greek psychiatrist and poet
  1952   – Paul Stanley, American singer-songwriter, guitarist, and producer
  1952   – John Witherow, South African-English journalist and author
1953 – Jeffrey Epstein, American financier and convicted sex offender (d. 2019)
1954 – Mohammad Dawran, Afghan aviator and military officer
  1954   – Alison Seabeck, English lawyer and politician
1955 – McKeeva Bush, Caymanian politician, Premier of the Cayman Islands
1956 – Maria Larsson, Swedish educator and politician, Swedish Minister of Health and Social Affairs
  1956   – Bill Maher, American comedian, political commentator, media critic, television host, and producer
  1956   – John Naber, American swimmer
1957 – Andy Sheppard, English saxophonist and composer
1958 – Lorenzo Lamas, American actor, director, and producer
  1958   – Amanda Villepastour, Australian-born ethnomusicologist and professional musician
1959 – Tami Hoag, American author
  1959   – R. A. Salvatore, American author
1963 – James Denton, American actor
  1963   – Mark Ryden, American painter and illustrator
1964 – Ozzie Guillén, Venezuelan-American baseball player and manager
  1964   – Ron Harper, American basketball player and coach
  1964   – Jack Lewis, American soldier and author
  1964   – Kazushige Nojima, Japanese screenwriter and songwriter
  1964   – Aquilino Pimentel III, Filipino lawyer and politician
  1964   – Fareed Zakaria, Indian-American journalist and author
1965 – Colin Calderwood, Scottish footballer and manager
  1965   – Sophie, Countess of Wessex
  1965   – Warren Joyce, English footballer and manager
  1965   – John Michael Montgomery, American singer-songwriter and guitarist
  1965   – Anton Weissenbacher, Romanian footballer
1966 – Rainn Wilson, American actor
1967 – Stacey Dash, American actress and television journalist 
  1967   – Kellyanne Conway, American political strategist and pundit 
1968 – Nick Anderson, American basketball player and sportscaster
  1968   – Junior Murray, Grenadian cricketer
1969 – Patrick K. Kroupa, American computer hacker and activist, co-founded MindVox
  1969   – Nicky Wire, Welsh singer-songwriter and bass player
1970 – Skeet Ulrich, American actor
1971 – Gary Barlow, English singer-songwriter, pianist, and producer
  1971   – Wakanohana Masaru, Japanese sumo wrestler, the 66th Yokozuna
  1971   – Questlove, American musician, record producer, and filmmaker
1972 – Nikki Haley, American accountant and politician, 116th Governor of South Carolina
1973 – Stephen Crabb, Scottish-Welsh politician, Secretary of State for Wales
  1973   – Queen Mathilde of Belgium
1975 – Norberto Fontana, Argentinian racing driver
  1975   – Zac Goldsmith, English journalist and politician
1976 – Kirsty Gallacher, Scottish television presenter
  1976   – Michael Myers, American football player
  1976   – Gretha Smit, Dutch speed skater
1977 – Paul Adams, South African cricketer and coach
1978 – Sonja Kesselschläger, German heptathlete
  1978   – Allan Søgaard, Danish footballer
1979 – Will Young, English singer-songwriter and actor
1980 – Karl Anderson, American wrestler
  1980   – Philippe Cousteau, Jr., American-French oceanographer and journalist
  1980   – Philippe Gagnon, Canadian swimmer
  1980   – Kim Jeong-hoon, South Korean singer and actor
1981 – Freddy Guzmán, Dominican baseball player
  1981   – Owen Hargreaves, English footballer
  1981   – Jason Richardson, American basketball player
1982 – Ruchi Sanghvi, Indian computer engineer
  1982   – Fredrik Strømstad, Norwegian footballer
1983 – Geovany Soto, Puerto Rican-American baseball player
1984 – Toni Gonzaga, Filipino singer and television personality
1987 – Evan Peters, American actor
1988 – Uwa Elderson Echiéjilé, Nigerian footballer
1989 – Nick Foles, American football player
  1989   – Jared Waerea-Hargreaves, New Zealand rugby league player
1991 – Ciara Hanna, American actress and model
  1991   – Tom Cairney, Scottish footballer
  1991   – Polona Hercog, Slovenian tennis player
1993 – Lorenzo Crisetig, Italian footballer
1994 – Seán Kavanagh, Irish footballer
  1994   – Lucas Piazon, Brazilian footballer 
1995 – Joey Badass, American rapper and actor
  1995   – Calum Chambers, English footballer
2000 – Tyler Herro, American basketball player
2003 – Antonia Ružić, Croatian tennis player

Deaths

Pre-1600
 820 – Al-Shafi‘i, Arab scholar and jurist (b. 767)
 842 – Theophilos, Byzantine emperor (b. 813)
 882 – Louis the Younger, king of the East Frankish Kingdom
 924 – Li Jitao, Chinese general of Later Tang
 928 – Zhao Guangfeng, Chinese official and chancellor
1029 – Heonae, Korean queen and regent (b. 964)
1095 – Wulfstan, bishop of Worcester
1156 – Henry, English bishop and saint
1189 – Shi Zong, Chinese emperor of Jin (b. 1123)
1191 – Frederick VI, duke of Swabia (b. 1167)
  1191   – Theobald V, count of Blois (b. 1130)
1265 – John Maunsell, English Lord Chancellor
1336 – John de Bohun, 5th Earl of Hereford (b. 1306)
1343 – Robert, king of Naples (b. 1275)
1479 – John II, king of Sicily (b. 1398)
1568 – Myles Coverdale, English bishop and translator (b. 1488)

1601–1900
1612 – Rudolf II, Holy Roman Emperor (b. 1552)
1663 – Isaac Ambrose, English minister and author (b. 1604)
1666 – Anne of Austria, Queen and regent of France (b. 1601)
1707 – Humphrey Hody, English scholar and theologian (b. 1659)
1709 – François de la Chaise, French priest (b. 1624)
1751 – John Hervey, 1st Earl of Bristol, English politician (b. 1665) 
1770 – Charles Yorke, English lawyer and politician, Lord Chancellor of Great Britain (b. 1722)
1779 – David Garrick, English actor, producer, playwright, and manager (b. 1717)
1810 – Benjamin Chew, American lawyer and judge (b. 1721)
1819 – Charles IV, Spanish king (b. 1748)
1837 – John Soane, English architect, designed the Bank of England (b. 1753)
1841 – Jørgen Jørgensen, Danish explorer (b. 1780)
  1841   – Minh Mạng, Vietnamese emperor (b. 1791)
1848 – Christian VIII, Danish king (b. 1786)
1850 – Adam Oehlenschläger, Danish poet and playwright (b. 1779)
1859 – Bettina von Arnim, German author, illustrator, and composer (b. 1785)
1852 – Ōnomatsu Midorinosuke, Japanese sumo wrestler, the 6th Yokozuna (b. 1794)
1873 – Basil Moreau, French priest, founded the Congregation of Holy Cross (b. 1799)
1875 – Jean-François Millet, French painter and educator (b. 1814)
1891 – Kalākaua, king of Hawaii (b. 1836)
1900 – John Ruskin, English painter and critic (b. 1819)

1901–present
1901 – Zénobe Gramme, Belgian engineer, invented the Gramme machine (b. 1826)
1907 – Agnes Mary Clerke, Irish astronomer and author (b. 1842)
1908 – John Ordronaux, American surgeon and academic (b. 1830)
1913 – José Guadalupe Posada, Mexican engraver and illustrator (b. 1852)
1915 – Arthur Guinness, 1st Baron Ardilaun, Irish businessman, philanthropist, and politician (b. 1840)
1920 – Georg Lurich, Estonian-Russian wrestler and strongman (b. 1876)
1921 – Mary Watson Whitney, American astronomer and academic (b. 1847)
1924 – Henry "Ivo" Crapp, Australian footballer and umpire (b. 1872)
1936 – George V of the United Kingdom (b. 1865)
1940 – Omar Bundy, American general (b. 1861)
1944 – James McKeen Cattell, American psychologist and academic (b. 1860)
1947 – Josh Gibson, American baseball player (b. 1911)
  1947   – Andrew Volstead, American member of the United States House of Representatives (b. 1860)
1954 – Warren Bardsley, Australian cricketer (b. 1882)
  1954   – Fred Root, English cricketer and umpire (b. 1890)
1955 – Robert P. T. Coffin, American author and poet (b. 1892)
1962 – Robinson Jeffers, American poet and philosopher (b. 1887)
1965 – Alan Freed, American radio host (b. 1922)
1971 – Broncho Billy Anderson, American actor, director, producer, and screenwriter (b. 1880)
  1971   – Minanogawa Tōzō, Japanese sumo wrestler, the 34th Yokozuna (b. 1903)
1973 – Lorenz Böhler, Austrian physician and surgeon (b. 1885)
  1973   – Amílcar Cabral, Guinea Bissauan-Cape Verdian engineer and politician (b. 1924)
1977 – Dimitrios Kiousopoulos, Greek jurist and politician, 151st Prime Minister of Greece (b. 1892)
1980 – William Roberts, English soldier and painter (b. 1895)
1983 – Garrincha, Brazilian footballer (b. 1933)
1984 – Johnny Weissmuller, American swimmer and actor (b. 1904)
1988 – Khan Abdul Ghaffar Khan, Pakistani activist and politician (b. 1890)
  1988   – Dora Stratou, Greek dancer and choreographer (b. 1903)
1989 – Alamgir Kabir, Bangladeshi director, producer, and screenwriter (b. 1938)
1990 – Barbara Stanwyck, American actress (b. 1907)
1993 – Audrey Hepburn, British actress and humanitarian activist (b. 1929)
1994 – Matt Busby, Scottish footballer and coach (b. 1909)
  1994   – Jaramogi Oginga Odinga, first Kenyan Vice-President (b. 1911)
1996 – Gerry Mulligan, American saxophonist and composer (b. 1927)
2002 – Carrie Hamilton, American actress and singer (b. 1963)
2003 – Al Hirschfeld, American painter and illustrator (b. 1903)
  2003   – Nedra Volz, American actress (b. 1908)
2004 – Alan Brown, English racing driver (b. 1919)
  2004   – T. Nadaraja, Sri Lankan lawyer and academic (b. 1917)
2005 – Per Borten, Norwegian lawyer and politician, 18th Prime Minister of Norway (b. 1913)
  2005   – Jan Nowak-Jeziorański, Polish journalist and politician (b. 1913)
  2005   – Miriam Rothschild, English zoologist, entomologist, and author (b. 1908)
2009 – Stéphanos II Ghattas, Egyptian patriarch (b. 1920)
2012 – Etta James, American singer-songwriter (b. 1938)
  2012   – John Levy, American bassist and manager (b. 1912)
  2012   – Ioannis Kefalogiannis, Greek politician, Greek Minister of the Interior (b. 1933)
  2012   – Alejandro Rodriguez, Venezuelan-American pediatrician and psychiatrist (b. 1918)
2013 – Pavlos Matesis, Greek author and playwright (b. 1933)
  2013   – Toyo Shibata, Japanese poet and author (b. 1911)
2014 – Claudio Abbado, Italian conductor (b. 1933)
  2014   – Otis G. Pike, American judge and politician (b. 1921)
  2014   – Jonas Trinkūnas, Lithuanian ethnologist and academic (b. 1939)
2016 – Mykolas Burokevičius, Lithuanian carpenter and politician (b. 1927)
  2016   – Edmonde Charles-Roux, French journalist and author (b. 1920)
2018 – Paul Bocuse, French chef (b. 1926)
  2018   – Naomi Parker Fraley, American naval machiner (b. 1921)
2020 – Jaroslav Kubera, Czech politician (b. 1947)
  2020   – Tom Fisher Railsback, American politician, member of the Illinois and U.S. House of Representatives (b. 1932)
2021 – Sibusiso Moyo, Zimbabwean politician, army general (b. 1960)
  2021   – Mira Furlan, Croatian actress and singer (b. 1955)
2022 – Meat Loaf, American singer and actor (b. 1947)

Holidays and observances
Armed Forces Day (Mali)
Army Day (Laos)
Christian feast day:
Abadios
Blessed Basil Moreau
Eustochia Smeralda Calafato
Euthymius the Great
Fabian
Manchán of Lemanaghan
Maria Cristina of the Immaculate Conception Brando 
Richard Rolle (Church of England)
Sebastian
Stephen Min Kuk-ka (one of The Korean Martyrs)
January 20 (Eastern Orthodox liturgics)
Heroes' Day (Cape Verde)
Inauguration Day, held every four years in odd-numbered years immediately following years divisible by 4, except for the public ceremony when January 20 falls on Sunday (the public ceremony is held the following day; however, the terms of offices still begin on the 20th) (United States of America, not a federal holiday for all government employees but only for those working in the Capital region)
Martyrs' Day (Azerbaijan)

Notes
In ancient astrology, it is the cusp day between Capricorn and Aquarius.

References

External links

BBC: On This Day

Historical Events on January 20

Days of the year
January